Okinawa Uno, also called  or simply Okinawa, is a small city and municipality of Bolivia, located in Ignacio Warnes Province in Santa Cruz Department. The town is found 146 km northeast of the city of Santa Cruz de la Sierra, between the Río Grande to the east and the Pailón River to the west. The municipality has a population of 12,482 inhabitants, according to the 2012 Bolivian census.

History 
The town was established by Okinawan immigrants after the end of the Pacific War, and, during its peak in the mid-60s, consisted of 565 families and over 3,000 Okinawans in total.

Demography

Location map

See also 
 Bolivia–Japan relations

References

Sources 

 
 

Municipalities of Santa Cruz Department (Bolivia)
Populated places in Santa Cruz Department (Bolivia)
Bolivia–Japan relations